{{DISPLAYTITLE:Adenosine A1 receptor}}

The adenosine A1 receptor is one member of the adenosine receptor group of G protein-coupled receptors with adenosine as endogenous ligand.

Biochemistry
A1 receptors are implicated in sleep promotion by inhibiting wake-promoting cholinergic neurons in the basal forebrain. A1 receptors are also present in smooth muscle throughout the vascular system.

The adenosine A1 receptor has been found to be ubiquitous throughout the entire body.

Signalling
Activation of the adenosine A1 receptor by an agonist causes binding of Gi1/2/3 or Go protein. Binding of Gi1/2/3 causes an inhibition of adenylate cyclase and, therefore, a decrease in the cAMP concentration. An increase of the inositol triphosphate/diacylglycerol concentration is caused by an activation of phospholipase C, whereas the elevated levels of arachidonic acid are mediated by DAG lipase, which cleaves DAG to form arachidonic acid.
Several types of potassium channels are activated but N-, P-, and Q-type calcium channels are inhibited.

Mechanism
This receptor has an inhibitory function on most of the tissues in which it rests. In the brain, it slows metabolic activity by a combination of actions. At the neuron's synapse, it reduces synaptic vesicle release.

Ligands
Caffeine, as well as theophylline, has been found to antagonize both A1 and A2A receptors in the brain.

Agonists
 2-Chloro-N(6)-cyclopentyladenosine (CCPA).
 N6-Cyclopentyladenosine
 N(6)-cyclohexyladenosine
Tecadenoson is an effective A1 adenosine agonist, as is selodenoson.
 Benzyloxy-cyclopentyladenosine (BnOCPA) is an A1R selective agonist.

PAMs 
 2‑Amino-3-(4′-chlorobenzoyl)-4-substituted-5-arylethynyl thiophene # 4e

Antagonists
Non-selective
 Caffeine
 Theophylline
 CGS-15943

Selective
 8-Cyclopentyl-1,3-dimethylxanthine (CPX / 8-cyclopentyltheophylline)
 8-Cyclopentyl-1,3-dipropylxanthine (DPCPX)
 8-Phenyl-1,3-dipropylxanthine
 Bamifylline
 BG-9719
 BG-9928
 FK-453
 FK-838
 Rolofylline (KW-3902)
 N-0861
 ISAM-CV202

In heart
The A1 and A2A receptors of endogenous adenosine are believed to play a role in regulating myocardial oxygen consumption and coronary blood flow. Stimulation of the A1 receptor has a myocardial depressant effect by decreasing the conduction of electrical impulses and suppressing pacemaker cell function, resulting in a decrease in heart rate. This makes adenosine a useful medication for treating and diagnosing tachyarrhythmias, or excessively fast heart rates. This effect on the A1 receptor also explains why there is a brief moment of cardiac standstill when adenosine is administered as a rapid IV push during cardiac resuscitation. The rapid infusion causes a momentary myocardial stunning effect.

In normal physiological states, this serves as protective mechanisms. However, in altered cardiac function, such as hypoperfusion caused by hypotension, heart attack or cardiac arrest caused by nonperfusing bradycardias, adenosine has a negative effect on physiological functioning by preventing necessary compensatory increases in heart rate and blood pressure that attempt to maintain cerebral perfusion.

In neonatal medicine
Adenosine antagonists are widely used in neonatal medicine;

Because a reduction in A1 expression appears to prevent hypoxia-induced ventriculomegaly and loss of white matter, the pharmacological blockade of A1 may have clinical utility.

Theophylline and caffeine are nonselective adenosine antagonists that are used to stimulate respiration in premature infants.

However, we are unaware of clinical studies that have examined the incidence of periventricular leukomalacia (PVL) as related to neonatal caffeine use. Caffeine may reduce cerebral blood flow in premature infants, it is presumed by blocking vascular A2 ARs. Thus, it may prove more advantageous to use selective A1 antagonists to help reduce adenosine-induced brain injury.

References

External links 
 
 
 
 

Adenosine receptors